Robecco sul Naviglio is a comune (municipality) in the Metropolitan City of Milan in the Italian region Lombardy, located about  west of Milan.

Twin towns
 Fosses-la-Ville, Belgium

References

External links
 Official website

Cities and towns in Lombardy